Succoth; ( and sometimes referred to as Succoff or Succot in Scots) is a village on the Cowal peninsula in Argyll and Bute, Scotland.

References

External links

 The three villages - website
 Gaelic place names of Scotland - website

Highlands and Islands of Scotland
Villages in Cowal